Dakos or ntakos, also known as koukouvagia or koukouvayia (κουκουβάγια, "owl") or—in eastern Crete—kouloukopsomo (from koulouki + psomi, pup + bread, allegedly the bread given to puppies), is a Cretan meze consisting of a slice of soaked dried bread or barley rusk (paximadi) topped with chopped tomatoes and crumbled feta or mizithra cheese, and flavored with herbs such as dried oregano. Olives and pepper can also be added.

The dish is similar to the Catalan pa amb tomàquet and the Italian frisella.

References

Cypriot cuisine
Bread salads
Bread dishes
Meze
Crete
Olive dishes
Greek cuisine
Cretan cuisine